Øllebrød (Danish for "beer bread") is a traditional Danish dish. It is a porridge or thick soup made of sourdough rye bread (rugbrød) and beer (often hvidtøl). These ingredients give it a slightly sour-sweet, caramelly, full taste. It is often eaten for breakfast, a par with oatmeal porridge. It is also regarded as easily digestible and nourishing and frequently served in hospitals and retirement homes.

Considered a thrifty dish, it's very rarely served at restaurants, but New Nordic Cuisine restaurants such as Noma and Agern (of chef Claus Meyer) have offered gourmet versions. 

Traditionally, bread scraps are used for øllebrød so as not to waste any bread that would otherwise get discarded. It's likely to be a very old dish, given that rye bread and beer were a ubiquitous staple. Some claim the recipe originated from monastic living, when monks would dip their bread into hot beer, but this isn't particularly plausible since both that practice and the ingredients would be present everywhere, especially in rural life.

Formerly, øllebrød would be served unsweetened and could be part of all meals of the day. Nowadays, it is mostly sweetened with sugar and eaten for breakfast with milk, cream, whipped cream or egg yolk beaten with sugar. 

Variety recipes spice it with lemon peel, orange peel or vanilla, but many Danes disapprove of this since øllebrød is (by most) not regarded a dessert.

It is best made of traditional rye bread of fine-ground flour. Since the 1970s, whole-grain rye bread, or rye bread with whole sunflower seeds, pumpkin seeds or similar, have become increasingly popular, but the grains or seeds will make a lumpy øllebrød, unless it is puréed with a blender or passed through a sieve.

Instant powder mixes, consisting of dried rye bread and sugar, have become commercially available. These mixes are similar to ymerdrys, differing only by a more fine ground content.

Øllebrød is also part of Scanian cuisine, formerly a Danish province.

A Norwegian dish exists of the same name, but is made of wheat flour, milk, beer and sugar. This yields a pale result. It is very rarely eaten today. In Denmark, it is called norsk (Norwegian) øllebrød.

See also 

Danish cuisine
 List of porridges

External links
 Wikibooks Cookbook: Øllebrød

Danish cuisine
Porridges